Camille Jones (born 25 June 1973) is a Danish pop singer. She is known for her song "The Creeps", written by herself and remixed by Dutch DJ Fedde le Grand, which became a worldwide club hit in the dance scene in 2007.

Career 
Camille Jones was born in Skanderborg, grew up in Aarhus, and spent a year as a YFU exchange student in the United States.  In 2000 she enjoyed success within the Danish and European music scenes with the release of her début album Camille Jones, which featured the singles Daddy Would Say and Nothing Comes From Nothing.

In 2004 she released her album Surrender, which featured the single The Creeps. The first video – produced by Mikkel Serup – was nominated for a Danish Music Award in 2005. Dutch DJ-producer Fedde le Grand signed the song to his own burgeoning Flamingo Recordings imprint and completed a House remix. In early 2007 the remix had been picked up by radiostations in the UK and all over Europe before it was released on Ministry of Sound in March 2007. Marcus Adams directed a new video for the single. The song had become a hit on the charts and the clubs as well. In the UK The Creeps reached No. 7 on the Single Charts and No. 1 on the Dance Charts.

Camille's third album Barking Up The Wrong Tree was released in Scandinavia in 2008 and featured the dance singles Difficult Guys, I Am (What You Want Me To Be) and Get Me Out. Videos for Difficult Guys and I Am (What You Want Me To Be) were produced to promote the record.

In January 2011 Jones collaborated with Kato, Ida Corr and Johnson on the Danish-language dance single Sjus. The song debuted at number 1 on the Danish Single charts.

Discography

Albums 
2000 – Camille Jones – Offbeat Records
2004 – Surrender – Offbeat Records
2005 – Surrender (International Version) – Alarm Music
2008 – Barking Up the Wrong Tree – Kick Music/Discowax
2011 – Did I Say I Love You – LiftedHouse
2016 – Camille – disco:wax

Singles 
2000 – Nothing Comes from Nothing
2000 – Should Have Known Better
2000 – Don't Wanna Be
2000 – Daddy Would Say
2005 – The Creeps
2006 – En Verden Perfekt
2007 – The Creeps (remixed by Fedde le Grand)
2008 – Difficult Guys
2008 – I Am (What You Want Me To Be)
2008 – Someday (Gauzz Mix)
2009 – Get Me Out (Jason Gault Remix)
2010 – The Truth
2011 – The Streets
2011 – Better Forget (feat. The House Keepers)
2012 – All I Want (feat. Phunkjump)
2012 – Tro, Håb og Kærlighed (Released in Denmark, Norway and Iceland)
2012 – Midnat I Mit Liv (Released in Scandinavia)
2013 – Waiting
2015 – All That Matters

Singles as featured artist 
2009 – I Like It (Morten Breum feat. Camille Jones)
2011 – Sjus (Kato feat. Ida Corr and Johnson)
2012 – All I Want (Phunkjump with Camille Jones)
2013 – Miss You (Alexander Brown feat. Camille Jones)
2013 – Good Enough (Ludovika feat. Camille Jones)
2013 – Feel Much Better (Epik feat. Camille Jones)
2014 – Battlefield (Svenstrup & Vendelboe feat. Camille Jones)

References 

1974 births
Living people
Danish dance musicians
Danish pop singers
Danish women singer-songwriters
English-language singers from Denmark
Singers from Aarhus
People from Skanderborg Municipality
21st-century Danish women singers